Heliopsis sinaloensis is a rare species of flowering plant in the family Asteraceae. It has been found only in the state of Sinaloa in northwestern Mexico.

References

sinaloensis
Flora of Sinaloa
Endemic flora of Mexico
Plants described in 1987